Cat Hellisen (born 31 May 1977) is the South African author of fantasy novels When the Sea is Rising Red, House of Sand and Secrets, and Beastkeeper..

Biography 
Cat Hellisen was born in Cape Town and has lived in Cape Town and Johannesburg, South Africa and Nottingham, England. They currently live in Scotland.

Awards 
In 2015, Cat Hellisen won the Short Story Day Africa award at the Ake Arts & Book Festival in Nigeria, presented by Prize judge Abubakar Adam Ibrahim, for their story "The Worme Bridge".

Works 

Novels

 When the Sea is Rising Red (Farrar, Straus and Giroux (BYR); 2012 (304 pp.))
 Beastkeeper (Henry Holt)
 House of Sand and Secrets (Folded Wherry; 2013)
 Charm (Smashwords; 2015)

Short Stories

 "This Reflection of Me" (Jabberwocky 3; Prime Books; 2007)
 "The Subtle Thief" (Something Wicked 4; 2007)
 "Jack of Spades, Reversed" (Something Wicked 17; 2012)
 "Mother, Crone, Maiden" (Tor.com; 2012)
 "Waking" (Apex Magazine, 2014)
 "The Girls Who Go Below" (The Magazine of Fantasy and Science Fiction, 2014)
 "Mouse Teeth" (Terra Incognita, Short Story day Africa Collection, 2015)
 "Serein" (Shimmer #26, July 2015)
 "Golden Wing, Silver Eye" (Ghost in the Cogs Anthology, Broken Eye Books, 31 October 2015)
 "I'm Only Going Over" (Daily Science Fiction, 11 December 2015)
 "The Face of Jarry" (Dreams From the Witch House: Female Voices of Lovecraftian Horror, Anthology, Dark Regions Press, 2016)
 "The Worme Bridge" (Water, Short Story Day Africa collection, 2016)
 "A Green Silk Dress and a Wedding-Death" (The Magazine of Fantasy and Science Fiction, March/April 2017)

Reception 

Publishers Weekly writes of When The Sea Is Rising Red, "Hellisen's style features evocative descriptions and unflinching detail, drawing readers into the unusual and intriguing elements that make up Felicita's socially complex world," while Kirkus says that "the worldbuilding intrigues, and the open-ended conclusion begs a sequel." In a starred review, The Bulletin of the Center for Children's Books writes, "Dark, foreboding, and not entirely redemptive, this is an intense look at the seeds of rebellion and the individual consequences they sometimes reap."

Kirkus calls the narration for Beastkeeper, “...thoughtful and lyrical. Figurative prose is memorable yet never flashy.” in a starred review. Publishers Weekly also gave it a star, saying, “Blending modern-day problems and ancient magical curses, Hellisen’s (When the Sea Is Rising Red) novel sparkles like a classic fairy tale, even as it plumbs unpleasant truths.” The Bulletin for the Center for Children's Books suggests in a starred review that "older fans of fairy tales and their retellings will revel in this poetic, tragic, epic story of a girl who is faced with the worst of what people can choose and instead decides to step outside of the curse and make her own way." Voya gives another star and writes, “"Beastkeeper is a bright, beautiful sliver of a novel ... Every page shimmers with magic."

The judges of Short Story Day Africa 2015 said of "The Worme Bridge": "The story works effortlessly to construct an other kind of reality while grounding itself in the real world. The writing is compelling: the reader is drawn into this family and the strangeness that overtakes them. We found this a powerful piece of writing that continues to haunt the reader afterwards.”

References

External links 
 Author Website
 Macmillan Author Page

South African women novelists
1977 births
Writers of young adult literature
South African fantasy writers
Women science fiction and fantasy writers
Living people
Women writers of young adult literature